Eva Rorandelli (born in Florence, June 17, 1977) is an Italian fashion designer, artist and former model.

Education and art 
Rorandelli studied painting at the Accademia di Belle Arti of Florence, Italy before moving to the United States in 1999 after winning a fellowship at the Woodstock School of Art. In 2000 her paintings were exhibited at the Lincoln Center for Performing Arts in New York, home of the Metropolitan Opera, New York City Ballet, and New York Philharmonic Orchestra. Her work has been shown in numerous exhibitions in France, Italy (Galleria Civica di Arte Moderna e Contemporanea di Torino, 2008, and Fondazione D’Ars, Milan, 2009), and the United States. Her video performances have appeared in galleries and museum exhibitions internationally, and have been described as evocative, disturbing, and empowering examples of posthuman art.

Runway modeling 
Rorandelli was discovered walking through the streets in New York in 1999. Upon signing with Q Management NYC, she moved to New York where her modeling career flourished. She was featured in campaigns by Favio Castellani, John Lewis, Valentino and Lee, La Senza, Maidenform, Passport, and Nordstrom. Additionally, she appeared in magazines including Flare, Vegas, Brides, and Vanidades, and walked for designers Gugliemo Cappone, Luciano Soprani, Elie Saab, Marina Babini, Yumi Katsura and Michino Koshino in Paris, Milan, San Francisco, and New York.

Personal life 
Rorandelli married interaction design professor Haakon Faste from Stanford, California. The ceremony was held at the Palazzo Vecchio of Florence in Italy.

References

External links

 Official Homepage
 Q Management NYC

1977 births
Living people
Italian female models
Models from Florence